Cumanotus beaumonti is a species of sea slug, an aeolid nudibranch, a marine gastropod mollusc in the family Cumanotidae.

Distribution
This species was described from Jennycliff Bay, Plymouth Sound, Devon, England, . It has been reported from the Irish Sea, Scotland and Norway.

References

Cumanotidae
Gastropods described in 1906